The Kagitumba–Kayonza–Rusumo Road is a road in the Eastern Province of Rwanda, connecting the urban centers of Kagitumba, at the border with Uganda to Kayonza, the district headquarters of Kayonza District and to Rusumo, at the border wirth Tanzania. The road connects the Northern Corridor in Uganda to the Central Corridor in Tanzania.

Location
The road starts at Kagitumba at the international border with Uganda.

Overview
Prior to 2018 this transport corridor, which lies entirely within Rwanda, was gravel-surfaced in varying stages of disrepair. Using funds provided by the government of Rwanda, together with loans and donations from development partners, the road was widened and improved to class II bitumen standard, with shoulders, drainage channels and culverts.

Upgrading to bitumen
In 2018, the upgrade of the road to grade II bitumen standard, with culverts, shoulders and drainage channels began. By the end of 2018, an estimated 75 percent of the work was complete, with total completion expected during the fourth quarter of 2019. At that time, the cost of improvements was quoted as €187,210,000 (approx. US$212,000,000).

Funding
The road widening and rehabilitation benefitted from funding by the following entities (a) Government of Rwanda (b) African Development Bank (c) European Union Africa Infrastructure Fund and (d) Japan International Cooperation Agency.

See also
 List of roads in Rwanda
 Economy of Rwanda

References

External links
 Rwanda: Rwf200 Billion Earmarked for Kagitumba-Kayonza Road Construction Works As of 8 September 2015.

Roads in Rwanda
Moroto District
Napak District
Katakwi District
Soroti District
Northern Region, Uganda
Eastern Region, Uganda